Saint-Antonin is a city in the Bas-Saint-Laurent region of Quebec, Canada, a few kilometres south of the city of Rivière-du-Loup, in Rivière-du-Loup Regional County Municipality. The municipality is named after Louis-Antonin or Antoine Proulx (1810-1896), priest of Fraserville (Rivière-du-Loup) and was founded in 1856.

On November 1, 2014, Saint-Antonin was changed from a parish municipality to a (regular) municipality.

Demographics
Population trend:
 Population in 2021: 4,338 (2016 to 2021 population change: 7.1%)
 Population in 2016: 4,049 
 Population in 2011: 4,027
 Population in 2006: 3,780
 Population in 2001: 3,395
 Population in 1996: 3,368

Private dwellings occupied by usual residents: 1,889 (total dwellings: 1,990)

Mother tongue:
 English as first language: 0.4%
 French as first language: 99.5%
 English and French as first language: 0.1%
 Other as first language: 0.1%

Education
Centre de services scolaire de Kamouraska - Rivière-du-Loup operates francophone public schools:
 École Lanouette 

The Eastern Shores School Board operates anglophone public schools:
 Metis Beach School in Métis-sur-Mer

References 

Répertoire des municipalités du Québec
Commission de toponymie du Québec
Affaires municipales et régions - cartes régionales

External links
 

Cities and towns in Quebec
Incorporated places in Bas-Saint-Laurent
Canada geography articles needing translation from French Wikipedia